The Maidstone was a 40-gun fourth-rate frigate of the English Royal Navy, originally built for the navy of the Commonwealth of England at Woodbridge, and launched in 1654.

After the Restoration of the monarchy in 1660, its name was changed to Mary Rose. By 1677 its armament was increased to 48 guns. It was used in the Anglo-Dutch Wars and the War of the Grand Alliance.  John Kempthorne commanded it in 1669, and fought off an attack by seven Algerian corsair ships in the Battle of Cádiz.  Mary Rose was captured by the French in 1691.

Notes

References

Lavery, Brian (2003) The Ship of the Line - Volume 1: The development of the battlefleet 1650-1850. Conway Maritime Press. .

Frigates of the Royal Navy
1650s ships
Captured ships